The Blow Out is a 1936 Warner Bros. Looney Tunes animated short film directed by Tex Avery. The short was released on April 4, 1936, and is the first Porky Pig solo cartoon.

Plot
As the cartoon opens, a hooded figure appears at the doorway of a building and leaves behind an alarm clock that suddenly starts smoking. At the next second, the clock explodes, blowing the building to smithereens. Afterwards, newspaper headlines explain that the figure, known as the Mad Bomber, has been terrorizing the entire city by placing time bombs at different buildings to blow them up. As a result, the police are making every effort to search the city and offer a cash reward of $2,000 to anybody who can capture the fiend.

In the Mad Bomber's hideout, the Mad Bomber is seen making his next time bomb. He does this by taking apart an alarm clock, stuffing it full of various explosives (dynamite, a black bomb, skyrockets, and firecrackers), and puts the alarm clock back together, to make a bomb that is capable of, as he puts it, "blowing up an entire city." After completing his bomb, the Mad Bomber looks at a map of the city, where x's mark the buildings he's already blown up, and draws an x to mark his next target, the Blotz Building. Then he dons a black hat and cloak and makes his way out of the hideout.

Elsewhere in the city, Porky Pig is staring into the window of an ice cream parlor where they sell ice cream sodas for 10 cents. After watching a customer buy and drink an ice cream soda, Porky checks his money and decides the five pennies he has are enough for the soda. Porky comes up to the manager and asks for an ice cream soda, but the manager points out that Porky has only half the amount of money for the soda. Porky starts to leave, feeling disappointed, but suddenly gets the idea that half a soda would be worth half the price. He zips back and requests half of a soda, but the manager still tells Porky that he needs five more pennies for the soda.

Porky leaves the parlor disappointed and sits down at the curb, wondering how to get five more pennies. As Porky does this, a rich gentleman walks by and drops his cane. Porky notices this and hands back the cane, to which the gentleman thanks Porky by giving him a penny. Overjoyed at being rewarded with a penny, Porky dances a jig and tosses the penny into his pocket, as this has solved his problem. With that, Porky retrieves a glove for a fancy dressed lady (just before the lady picks it up herself) and a handkerchief for Mrs. Cudd (after seeing it all the way from a corner down the street), each time being rewarded with a penny and dancing a jig before putting them into his pocket.

During the quest, Porky spies a nickel on the pavement and decides it could save him the trouble of earning two more pennies, but before he can pick it up, a scotty dog zips down all the way from a corner and steals the nickel. Whether the scotty dog dropped the nickel on the ground or the nickel was a rare one is never revealed, the scotty dog doesn't thank Porky for finding it nor reward him with a penny. Undaunted, Porky continues on his quest to retrieve lost items.

At this point, on the same street, the Mad Bomber stops outside the Blotz Building. He takes the time bomb out from under his cloak, activates the timer, and leaves the bomb at the base of the building. Porky happens to see the Mad Bomber leave the scene and, thinking the time bomb is just a regular alarm clock and the Mad Bomber lost it, picks up the bomb. He finds the Mad Bomber in an alley, waiting for the explosion, and hands the bomb back to him, in the hopes of being rewarded with a penny, but the Mad Bomber freaks out and runs away, leaving Porky to chase after him.

The Mad Bomber then runs through several buildings (with Porky following him) and tries hiding in a garage, but one of the double doors is missing and after the Mad bomber shuts it, Porky appears through the opening and tries to hand back the bomb. The Mad Bomber then zips up the fire escape of an apartment building and makes it to the top, but Porky takes the steps up to meet him with the bomb. The Mad Bomber zips back down and finds Porky at the bottom of the building. He tries ducking into an open manhole to hide under the street, but no matter where he turns, Porky is there, still trying to hand back the bomb. The Mad Bomber finally gets out from under the street and tries blocking the manhole with a safety sign (vowing to have Porky blown to bits), but Porky comes out from another manhole and grabs hold of the Mad Bomber's cloak.

At that moment, two policemen spot the Mad Bomber and they pursue him, thinking that Porky holding onto the Mad Bomber's cloak is a sign that Porky's trying to tackle him. The Mad Bomber reaches his hideout, and just as the police, followed by the press arrive at the scene, he locks five doors to the entrance and barricades the last door with various furniture, vowing that they'll never find him.  Once more, however, Porky appears and tries to hand back the time bomb. The Mad Bomber decides he's had it and flees the hideout, only to run into the waiting police paddy wagon. Porky then comes out, shoves the bomb (now beginning to smoke) into the paddy wagon, and holds out his hand, expecting the Mad Bomber to pay him a penny for his troubles, but as the paddy wagon drives away to the City Jail, the bomb blows up on its creator, sending fireworks and skyrockets shooting out of the paddy wagon.

Since Porky has helped catch the Mad Bomber, the Chief of Police rewards him with the $2000 cash reward. Porky once more dances a victory jig, but as he tosses the money bag into the air (thinking he's been rewarded with a penny), it hits him on the head and bursts open. One of the reporters asks Porky what he intends to do with his reward, to which Porky starts to reply "I'm g-g-gonna b-b-b-buy me a..."  The final scene then shows Porky back in the Ice Cream Parlor gulping down one ice cream soda after another, revealing that he used the $2000 reward to buy a feast of 20,000 ice cream sodas.

Outside references
Thomas Pynchon refers to the cartoon involving "Porky Pig and the anarchist" several times in his novels The Crying of Lot 49  and Gravity's Rainbow.

References

External links

1936 animated films
1936 films
1930s American animated films
1936 comedy films
American black-and-white films
Films scored by Bernard B. Brown
Films scored by Norman Spencer (composer)
Films about terrorism in the United States
Films directed by Tex Avery
Porky Pig films
Looney Tunes shorts
Warner Bros. Cartoons animated short films
1930s English-language films